Spinochordodes is a genus of worms belonging to the family Chordodidae.

The species of this genus are found in Europe.

Species:

Spinochordodes actiniphorus 
Spinochordodes bacescui 
Spinochordodes baeri 
Spinochordodes cameranoi 
Spinochordodes europaeus 
Spinochordodes piliferus 
Spinochordodes skrjabini 
Spinochordodes tellinii 
Spinochordodes vitiferus

References

Nematomorpha